This is a list of the first-level administrative divisions of mainland China (including all provinces, autonomous regions, and municipalities) in order of tax revenues collected in 2007. The figures are given in millions of Renminbi in 2007.

Notes 
  Nei Mongol is the only province in China to levy a tax on banquets.
  Shanxi province collects about 60 per cent of the slaughter tax in China.
  Xinjiang is the only province in China to levy a tax on animal husbandry.

References 

Tax
Taxation in China
China, tax revenue